María Cristina Ardila-Robayo (15 February 1947–24 November 2017) was a Colombian herpetologist. She was professor at the National University of Colombia, Bogotá, and worked closely with the Natural History Museum of the university. In 2010 she was credited as having described 28 new species of amphibians from Colombia; as of late 2018, the Amphibian Species of the World lists 31 valid species described by her. She also worked with caimans and crocodiles and lead biodiversity restoration projects.

The following amphibians are named after her:
 Pristimantis cristinae — Cristina's robber frog
 Rhinella cristinae (a beaked toad)
 Nymphargus cristinae (a glass frog)
 Atelopus ardila (a harlequin toad)

Species described

References

2017 deaths
Women herpetologists
Academic staff of the National University of Colombia
1947 births
Colombian women biologists
20th-century Colombian women scientists
20th-century Colombian zoologists